Ashina Tuwu was an early Tujue chief and ancestor of Göktürk khagans. Besides carrying title of Da Yehu (大葉護 Grand Yabgu) nothing is known about him.

Family 

 Great-Great-Grandfather: Yizhi Nishidu (伊質泥師都) - Mythical ancestor of Turkic peoples, son of a she-wolf
 Great-Grandfather: Neduliu shad (訥都六設) - Eldest son of Yizhi Nishidu, legendary ancestor of Turkic clans 
 Grandfather: Ashina (阿史那) - Youngest child of Neduliu shad, semi-legendary ancestor of Ashina clan
 Father: Axian shad (阿賢設) - Submitted to Rouran
 Son: Bumin Qaghan
 Son: Istemi Yabgu

References 

 

Göktürk khagans
6th-century Turkic people
Year of birth unknown
Ashina house of the Turkic Empire